Ya Habayeb is Najwa Karam's first studio album, released in 1989.

Track listing
 "Ya Habayeb" (My loved ones)
 "Weqolo Rujo'oa" (And they say he's going to return)
 "Khally Ketfak" (Leave your shoulder beside mine)
 "Ma Ba'd Ayounak" (I don't want your eyes)
 "Deqy Ya Tbool" (Play the drums)
 "Elhaq Alaye"  (It's my fault)
 "Beladayet" (Country-Mawwal)

Najwa Karam albums
1989 debut albums